The Man Who Smiles (Italian: L'uomo che sorride) is a 1936 Italian "white-telephones" comedy film about an Oedipus Complex, directed by Mario Mattoli. The film stars Vittorio De Sica, Umberto Melnati, Enrico Viarisio, Assia Noris and Paola Borboni.

The film premiered in the USA on 16 April 1937.

Cast
Vittorio De Sica as  Pio Fardella
Umberto Melnati as  Dino
Enrico Viarisio as  Commendator Ercole Piazza
Assia Noris as  Adriana
Paola Borboni as  La contessa
Armando Migliari as  Agostino
Luisa Garella as  Edvige
Vanna Vanni
Ermanno Roveri

References

External links
 

1936 films
Italian black-and-white films
1930s Italian-language films
1936 comedy films
Films directed by Mario Mattoli
Italian comedy films
1930s Italian films